Woldemichael Ghebremariam is the second Minister of Land, Water, & Environment of Eritrea. His predecessor was arrested as a member of the G-15.

References

Living people
People's Front for Democracy and Justice politicians
Government ministers of Eritrea
Year of birth missing (living people)